Petite-Rivière-de-Nippes is a commune in the Miragoâne Arrondissement, in the Nippes department of Haiti.
It has 29,815 inhabitants. Petite-Rivière-de-Nippes is one of the 28 communes in which the Pan American Development Foundation implements the Government of Haiti's Project for Participatory Development (PRODEP).

References

Populated places in Nippes
Communes of Haiti